Chinese Taipei participated in the 2010 Summer Youth Olympics in Singapore.

Medalists

Archery

Boys

Girls

Mixed Team

Athletics

Boys
Track and Road Events

Field Events

Girls
Track and Road Events

Field Events

Badminton

Boys

Girls

Judo

Individual

Team

Shooting

Pistol

Swimming

Table tennis

Individual

Team

Taekwondo

Tennis

Singles

Doubles

Weightlifting

References

External links
Competitors List: Chinese Taipei

2010 in Taiwanese sport
Nations at the 2010 Summer Youth Olympics
Chinese Taipei at the Youth Olympics